Started in 1991, the Finger Lakes GrassRoots Festival of Music and Dance is an annual festival held the second-to-last weekend of July in Trumansburg, New York, a small town ten miles north of Ithaca.

The GrassRoots Festival, or simply GrassRoots, as it is known, draws nearly 20,000 visitors throughout the course of four days.   GrassRoots presents over 70 musicians, bands and dance troupes on four simultaneously running stages continually throughout the long weekend. Genres represented among the musicians include bluegrass, Cajun, zydeco, African, reggae, country, Americana, Native American music, old-time music, Irish music, jam band, rock and roll, hip hop, Conjunto, rockabilly and more.

The festival was nominated as one of USA Today's top 10 outdoor music festivals. In 2003 the associated Shakori Hills Grassroots Festival began, modeled after the Finger Lakes festival.

Details 

GrassRoots was founded by popular Americana band Donna the Buffalo and celebrated its twentieth year in 2010.

In addition to the musical performances at GrassRoots, attendees may also visit the Art Barn, an art gallery featuring primarily local artists; a Healing Arts area, where free massages, Reiki, acupuncture, and other healing therapies are performed; a children's area; dance workshops and more.
In 2005 a "musicalmentary" about the festival titled Grassroots Stages was distributed nationally on PBS. The film includes musical performances and interviews with festival organizers Jeb and Jordan Puryear.

See also
List of jam band music festivals
List of bluegrass music festivals
Donna the Buffalo

References

External links

Rock festivals in the United States
Jam band festivals
Folk festivals in the United States
Music festivals established in 1991
Music festivals in New York (state)
1991 establishments in New York (state)